"Picture Perfect" is a single by London-based collective Roll Deep The song was released in the United Kingdom on 22 January 2012 as the lead single from their upcoming fifth studio album X. The song peaked to number 19 on the UK Indie Chart.

Music video
A music video to accompany the release of "Picture Perfect" was first released onto YouTube on 28 November 2011 at a total length of three minutes and thirty-nine seconds.

Track listing
Digital download
 "Picture Perfect" - 3:36
 "Picture Perfect" (Mensah Remix) - 4:41
 "Picture Perfect" (Exemen Remix) - 4:41
 "Picture Perfect" (Spoon and Horx Remix) - 4:21
 "Picture Perfect" (Dave Silcox and Matt Nash) - 5:08
 "Picture Perfect" (Cutline Remix) - 4:51

Chart performance

Release history

References

2012 singles
Roll Deep songs
2012 songs
Cooking Vinyl singles